Silvio Francesconi (23 October 1952 – 1 June 2021) was an Italian football player and manager. He played as a midfielder for, among others, A.S.D. Sarzanese Calcio 1906, Ternana Calcio and S.S.D. Sanremese Calcio.

Francesconi died on 1 June 2021, aged 68, from COVID-19.

References

1952 births
2021 deaths
Italian footballers
Association football midfielders
Serie A players
U.S. Massese 1919 players
A.C. Carpi players
Carrarese Calcio players
Ternana Calcio players
Udinese Calcio players
S.S.D. Sanremese Calcio players
Place of death missing
Sportspeople from the Province of Massa-Carrara
Deaths from the COVID-19 pandemic in Tuscany
Footballers from Tuscany